Mount Andromeda is, at , the higher and more southerly of the twin ice domes, this one marking the summit of Candlemas Island, South Sandwich Islands. It was named by the United Kingdom Antarctic Place-Names Committee in 1971 in association with nearby Mount Perseus, the name referring to Andromeda, the mythical heroine rescued from a sea monster by the hero Perseus.

References
 

Mountains and hills of South Georgia and the South Sandwich Islands
Volcanoes of the Atlantic Ocean
Volcanoes of South Georgia and the South Sandwich Islands